Pedro Miguel Braço Forte Russiano (born 19 November 1984), simply known as Pedro Russiano is a Portuguese former footballer and current manager.

Russiano was part of the Vitória Setúbal side who reached the 2005–06 Taça de Portugal.

After several unsuccessful seasons playing in Portugal, Russiano left for Italian club Gela Calcio. He would remain with the Italian side for one season after only five appearances. Following his departure from Gela, Russiano would have spells at Romanian side Gloria Buzău and Bahraini Al-Riffa before moving back to Portugal to play for Louletano.

References

External links
 
 

1984 births
Living people
People from Montijo, Portugal
Portuguese footballers
Association football forwards
Primeira Liga players
FC Porto players
Segunda Divisão players
Associação Académica de Coimbra – O.A.F. players
Vitória F.C. players
Louletano D.C. players
S.S.D. Città di Gela players
Liga I players
FC Gloria Buzău players
Portuguese expatriate footballers
Expatriate footballers in Italy
Portuguese expatriate sportspeople in Italy
Expatriate footballers in Romania
Portuguese expatriate sportspeople in Romania
Expatriate footballers in Bahrain
Portuguese football managers
Sportspeople from Setúbal District